Gremyachy is a rural locality (a khutor) in Shebekinsky District, Belgorod Oblast, Russia. The population was 41 as of 2010. There are 7 streets.

Geography 
Gremyachy is located 25 km north of Shebekino (the district's administrative centre) by road. Koshlakovo is the nearest rural locality.

References 

Rural localities in Shebekinsky District